Henan University of Animal Husbandry and Economy is an undergraduate college in Zhengzhou, Henan, which was established in 2013 from the merger of Zhengzhou College of Animal Husbandry Engineering and Henan Business College. It occupies an area of 141 hectares and has more than 30,000 full-time in-person students. It has 1492 full-time instructors, including 1040 with postgraduate training.

The college includes more than 20 departments, including animal science and technology, veterinary medicine, food engineering, business administration, and accounting. Available specializations include agronomy, engineering, management, economics, science, literature, law, and art.

Departments 
Animal science and technology (with an attached feed engineering and technology research center)
Veterinary medicine (with an attached center for pig disease control and prevention)
Food engineering
Business administration (with an attached research institute on the development of Henanese companies)
Accounting
Finance
Pharmaceutical engineering
Bioengineering
Packaging and printing engineering
Management of farming and forestry
Logistics and e-commerce
Engineering management
Automation
Energy and power engineering
Economics and business
Information technology and electronic engineering
Software (combined with a department for public computer courses)
Grammar (with an attached research institute on Henan business culture and a legal research institute)
Art (with an attached research center for art, painting, and calligraphy)
Tourism management
Foreign languages
International education
Ideological and political theory
Core curriculum
Beilong physical education
Yingcai physical education
Public foreign language teaching and research
Continuing education
Experimental research center

References

External links 

Educational institutions established in 1957
Educational institutions established in 2013
Universities and colleges in Zhengzhou
Animal husbandry